Midlands 4 West (South) is a level 9 English Rugby Union league and level 4 of the Midlands League, made up of teams from the southern part of the West Midlands region including clubs from parts of Birmingham and the West Midlands, Herefordshire, Warwickshire, Worcestershire and even on occasion Oxfordshire, with home and away matches played throughout the season.  Each year some of the clubs in this division also take part in the RFU Junior Vase - a level 9-12 national competition.

Formed for the 2006-07 season, the division was originally known as Midlands 5 West (South) but changed to its present name for the 2008-09 season due to league restructuring. Promoted teams tend to move up to Midlands 3 West (South) while relegated teams drop to Midlands 5 West (South).

2021-22

Participating teams & locations

Birmingham Civil Service, who finished 10th in 2019-20, did not return for the current season.

2020–21
Due to the COVID-19 pandemic, the 2020–21 season was cancelled.

2019–20

Participating teams & locations

2018–19

Participating teams & locations

2017–18

Participating teams & locations

Teams 2016-17
Alcester
Bromyard
Claverdon
Coventrians  
Coventry Welsh
Harbury (relegated from Midlands 3 West (South))
Keresley (promoted from Midlands 5 West (South))
Kings Norton
Pershore (relegated from Midlands 3 West (South))
Redditch
Stoke Old Boys

Teams 2015-16
Alcester (promoted from Midlands 5 West (South))
Atherstone
Birmingham Civil Service (promoted from Midlands 5 West (South))
Claverdon
Coventrians  
Coventry Welsh
Kings Norton 
Manor Park (relegated from Midlands 3 West (South))
Redditch
Stoke Old Boys
Upton-on-Severn (relegated from Midlands 3 West (South))

Teams 2014-15
Atherstone
Claverdon  
Coventrians
Coventry Welsh
Evesham (relegated from Midlands 3 West (South))
Five Ways Old Edwardians
Kings Norton (relegated from Midlands 3 West (South))
Redditch
Rugby Lions (promoted from Midlands 5 West (South))
Stoke Old Boys
Warwickian (promoted from Midlands 5 West (South))

Teams 2013-14
Alcester
Atherstone
Barton-under-Needwood
Birmingham Civil Service
Claverdon  
Coventrians
Coventry Welsh
Harbury
Redditch (relegated from Midlands 3 West (South))
Stoke Old Boys
Woodrush (relegated from Midlands 3 West (South))

Teams 2012–13
Alcester
Atherstone
Birmingham C.S.
Claverdon
Coventrians
Coventry Welsh
Harbury
Keresley
Manor Park
Old Yardleians
Warwickian

Teams 2008–09
Copsewood 
Coventrians 
Coventry Welsh
Dudley Wasps
Evesham 
Harbury
Keresley
Manor Park
Pinley
Redditch
Stoke Old Boys
Worcester Students

Worcester Students withdrew from the league after failing to field 15 players regularly.

Original teams

When this division was introduced in 2006 as Midlands 5 West (South), it contained the following teams:

Alcester - transferred from Warwickshire 1 (7th) 
Bredon Star - transferred from North Midlands (South) 1 (6th)
Coventry Technical - promoted from Warwickshire 2 (champions)
Coventry Welsh - transferred from Warwickshire 1 (4th)
Harbury - relegated from Midlands 4 West (South) (10th)
Rugby St Andrews - transferred from Warwickshire 1 (5th)
Southam - transferred from Warwickshire 1 (3rd)
Stoke Old Boys - transferred from Warwickshire 1 (6th)
Upton-upon-Severn - transferred from North Midlands (South) 1 (runners up)
Woodrush - transferred from North Midlands (South) 1 (5th)

Midlands 4 West (South) Honours

Midlands 5 West (South) (2006–2009)

League restructuring ahead of the 2006–07 season saw the introduction of Midlands 5 West (South) at tier 9 to replace the discontinued North Midlands 1 and Warwickshire 1 leagues.  Promotion was to Midlands 4 West (South) and relegation to Midlands 6 West (South-East) or Midlands 6 West (South-West).

Midlands 4 West (South) (2009–present)

Further league restructuring by the RFU meant that Midlands 5 West (North) and Midlands 5 West (South) were renamed as Midlands 4 West (North) and Midlands 4 West (South), with both leagues remaining at tier 9.  Promotion was now to Midlands 3 West (South) (formerly Midlands 4 West (South)) and relegation to Midlands 5 West (South) (formerly two regional divisions known as Midlands 6 West (South-East) and Midlands 6 West (South-West)).

Number of league titles

Woodrush (2)
Evesham (1)
Bromyard (1)
Burbage (1)
Manor Park (1)
Old Yardleians (1)
Old Wheatleyans (1)
Pinley (1)
Redditch (1)
Rugby Lions (1)
Rugby St Andrews (1)
Stoke Old Boys (1)
Tenbury (1)

Notes

See also
Midlands RFU
North Midlands RFU
Warwickshire RFU
English rugby union system
Rugby union in England

References

Rugby First: To view previous seasons in the league, search for any club within that league then click on to club details followed by fixtures and then select the appropriate season.

9
5